Jessica Gunning is an English television and theatre actress. She was educated at Holmfirth High School near Huddersfield before attending Rose Bruford College, graduating in 2007.

Acting career
Gunning began her stage career at the National Theatre in productions including Much Ado About Nothing and Major Barbara. On television, she guest-starred in the Doctor Who episode "Partners in Crime". She also appeared in Mutual Friends before taking a recurring role as Angela in Law & Order: UK in 2009. She was also in Life of Riley as well as playing Branita in the TV pilot Lizzie and Sarah, written by Julia Davis and Jessica Hynes.

In 2012 she played the character of Orla in the BBC television series White Heat. This was followed by a lead role as Melissa Young in BBC drama What Remains. In 2013, Gunning also played the part of Summer in an episode of Great Night Out for ITV and the following year starred as Siân James in the Golden Globe- and BAFTA-nominated film Pride, finishing 2014 in That Day We Sang, a television film written and directed by Victoria Wood.

In other television work, Gunning was also seen in The Scandalous Lady W on BBC Two and played Shirley Allerdyce in Sky Atlantic’s series Fortitude. She played the character of WPC Kath Morgan in Prime Suspect 1973, DC Sophie Carson in In the Dark and Umm Walid in the Channel 4 drama The State. In 2019 Jessica performed alongside Cate Blanchett at the National Theatre in When We Have Sufficiently Tortured Each Other, written by Martin Crimp and directed by Katie Mitchell.

Jessica plays the character of Jan in the Channel 4 comedy Back and can be seen as Diane Pemberley in BBC One’s The Outlaws, created by Stephen Merchant.

Filmography

Television

Film

References

External links
 

Living people
British actresses
Alumni of Rose Bruford College
Year of birth missing (living people)
Actresses from Yorkshire
People from Kirklees (district)